In India, Diploma in Pharmacy (often shortened as DPharm or DPharma) is an entry-level tertiary pharmacy credential. It is obtained following two-year of training. Students can enroll in the course after successfully completing  higher secondary education in science stream with physics, chemistry and either biology or maths as subjects. After obtaining the diploma, registration with the pharmacy council is required to be a registered pharmacist. A D.Pharm holder can also enroll for a professional (undergraduate) degree course of Bachelor of Pharmacy via lateral entry scheme.

A diploma holder can be employed as a registered pharmacist in a hospital or pharmacy dispensing drugs and pharmaceuticals. It is mandatory that at least one person employed in a pharmacy be a qualified and registered pharmacist.

References

External links 
 Pharmacy council of India

Academic degrees of India
Pharmacy education in India